Maple Creek (formerly, Maplecreek) is an unincorporated community in Humboldt County, California.

A post office operated at Maple Creek from 1886 to 1923.

See also

Climate
This region experiences warm (but not hot) and dry summers, with no average monthly temperatures above 71.6 °F.  According to the Köppen Climate Classification system, Maple Creek has a warm-summer Mediterranean climate, abbreviated "Csb" on climate maps.

References

Unincorporated communities in Humboldt County, California
Unincorporated communities in California